"Say Wonderful Things" can refer to:

Say Wonderful Things (song), a 1963 song with music by Philip Green and lyrics by Norman Newell, chosen as the UK Eurovision entry sung by Ronnie Carroll in 1963, popularized in the US by Patti Page
Say Wonderful Things (album), a 1963 Patti Page album containing the song